Gwynfor Leonard Benson (born 7 January 1941) is a former English cricketer.  Benson was a right-handed batsman who bowled right-arm off break.  He was born at Birmingham, Warwickshire.

Benson made his first-class debut for Warwickshire against Scotland in 1959.  He made two further first-class appearances for the county, both of which came in 1961 against Oxford University and Cambridge University.  In his three first-class matches, he scored a total of 102 runs at an average of 34.00, with a highest score of 46.  With the ball, he took 2 wickets at a bowling average of 16.00, with best figures of 2/25.

References

External links
Gwynfor Benson at ESPNcricinfo

1941 births
Living people
Cricketers from Birmingham, West Midlands
English cricketers
Warwickshire cricketers
English cricketers of 1946 to 1968